D. E. Jones may refer to:
 David Evan Jones (missionary), Welsh missionary
 Denny Jones, Oregon rancher and politician
 David Evan Jones (composer), American composer

See also
Jones (surname)